A quadruple bond is a type of chemical bond between two atoms involving eight electrons. This bond is an extension of the more familiar types double bonds and triple bonds. Typically the ligands that support quadruple bonds are π-donors, not π-acceptors.

History
Chromium(II) acetate, Cr2(μ-O2CCH3)4(H2O)2, was the first chemical compound containing a quadruple bond to be synthesized. It was described in 1844 by E. Peligot, although its distinctive bonding was not recognized for more than a century.

The very short Re–Re distance was noted. This short distance (and the salt's diamagnetism) indicated Re–Re bonding. These researchers however misformulated the anion as a derivative of Re(II), i.e., .

Soon thereafter, F. Albert Cotton and C.B. Harris reported the crystal structure of potassium octachlorodirhenate or K2[Re2Cl8]·2H2O. This structural analysis indicated that the previous characterization was mistaken. Cotton and Harris formulated a molecular orbital rationale for the bonding that explicitly indicated a quadruple bond. The rhenium–rhenium bond length in this compound is only 224 pm. In molecular orbital theory, the bonding is described as σ2π4δ2 with one sigma bond, two pi bonds and one delta bond.

Structure and bonding

The [Re2Cl8]2− ion adopts an eclipsed conformation as shown at left. The delta bonding orbital is then formed by overlap of the d orbitals on each rhenium atom, which are perpendicular to the Re–Re axis and lie in between the Re–Cl bonds. The d orbitals directed along the Re–Cl bonds are stabilized by interaction with chlorine ligand orbitals and do not contribute to Re–Re bonding. In contrast, the [Os2Cl8]2− ion with two more electrons (σ2π4δ2δ*2) has an Os–Os triple bond and a staggered geometry.

Many other compounds with quadruple bonds between transition metal atoms have been described, often by Cotton and his coworkers.  Isoelectronic with the dirhenium compound is the salt K4[Mo2Cl8] (potassium octachlorodimolybdate). An example of a ditungsten compound with a quadruple bond is ditungsten tetra(hpp).

Quadruple bonds between atoms of main-group elements are unknown. Molecular orbital theory shows that there are two sets of paired electrons in the sigma system (one bonding, one antibonding), and two sets of paired electrons in a degenerate π-bonding set of orbitals. This adds up to give a bond order of 2, meaning that there exists a double bond between the two carbon atoms in a dicarbon (C2) molecule. The molecular orbital diagram of diatomic carbon would show that there are two pi bonds and no sigma bonds. However, a recent paper by S. Shaik et al. has suggested that a quadruple bond exists in diatomic carbon, but this is disputed.

See also
 Covalent bond
 Bond order

References

Further reading

Chemical bonding